Etosha Secondary School is a school in Tsumeb in the Oshikoto Region of northern Namibia. It is one of the best academic performers in the northern regions and Namibia as a whole.

Founded in 1964, the school is now run by the current principal Mr A. Kaishungu and he has been the headmaster for the past five years. The school has a tradition in sport and has produced a number of sportsmen and women that have gone on to wear the national colors.

See also
 Education in Namibia
 List of schools in Namibia

References

External links 
 

1964 establishments in South West Africa
Schools in Oshikoto Region